Sport, Sport, Sport is a 1970 Soviet sports film directed by Elem Klimov.

The film combines staged scenes, documentary episodes about Soviet and foreign athletes, newsreels.

Plot 
The film tells the history of the development of sports, showing the stadiums of Moscow, Philadelphia, Stockholm and Mexico City in the past and future.

Cast 
 Zinoviy Gerdt as narrator (voice)
 Georgiy Svetlani as uncle Volodya (voiced by Rolan Bykov)
 Larisa Shepitko as queen
 Nikita Mikhalkov as  Kiribeevich
 Leonid Tarnovsky as accordionist
 Yevgeny Moskalyov as swimmer
 Igor Klass as Ivan the Terrible 
 Boris Romanov as merchant Kalashnikov
 Valeri Brumel as cameo
 Yevgeny Matveev as cameo
 Bella Akhmadulina as cameo
 Daniel Olbrychski as cameo
Vadim Sinyavsky as cameo
 Vladimir Andreev as cameo

References

External links 
 

1970 films
1970 documentary films
1970s sports comedy films
1970s Russian-language films
Soviet documentary films
Soviet sports comedy films
Films directed by Elem Klimov
Mosfilm films
Russian sports comedy films
Films scored by Alfred Schnittke
Documentary films about sports